İSTOÇ is an underground rapid transit station on the M3 line of the Istanbul Metro. It is located in the northwestern tip of Bağcılar under the Istanbul Wholesalers Market (shortened as İSTOÇ). Opened on 14 June 2013 it has an island platform serviced by two tracks.

Layout

References

Railway stations opened in 2013
Istanbul metro stations
Başakşehir